Emmanuel Tetteh   (born 25 December 1974) is a retired Ghanaian football player.

Career
Tetteh began his career with Accra Hearts of Oak SC in Ghana. He moved to Europe to play for K. Sint-Truidense V.V. and FC Winterthur, before moving to Lechia Gdańsk and Polonia Warsaw. He had a spell in Sweden with IFK Göteborg and played for Vanspor, Trabzonspor, Bursaspor, and Çaykur Rizespor in the Turkish Super Lig.

Tetteh made his debut for the Ghana national football team in a friendly against South Africa on 1994. He is the brother of Joseph Annor Aziz

References

External links

1974 births
Living people
Ghanaian footballers
Ghana international footballers
Ghanaian expatriate footballers
Accra Hearts of Oak S.C. players
Sint-Truidense V.V. players
FC Winterthur players
Lechia Gdańsk players
Polonia Warsaw players
IFK Göteborg players
Vanspor footballers
Trabzonspor footballers
Bursaspor footballers
Çaykur Rizespor footballers
1998 African Cup of Nations players
Allsvenskan players
Süper Lig players
Ekstraklasa players
Expatriate footballers in Sweden
Expatriate footballers in Turkey
Expatriate footballers in Switzerland
Expatriate footballers in Poland
Expatriate footballers in Belgium
Ghanaian expatriate sportspeople in Sweden
Ghanaian expatriate sportspeople in Turkey
Ghanaian expatriate sportspeople in Switzerland
Ghanaian expatriate sportspeople in Poland
Ghanaian expatriate sportspeople in Belgium
Association football forwards